Balkan Beat Box is the self-titled debut album from the Israeli electronica-world fusion trio Balkan Beat Box.

Track listing

References

Balkan Beat Box albums
2005 debut albums